Frank Boardman "Pistol Pete" Eaton (October 26, 1860 – April 8, 1958) was a scout, sheriff, and cowboy.

Early life
Eaton was born in 1860 in Hartford, Connecticut, and at the age of eight, he moved with his family to Twin Mound, Kansas.

When Eaton was eight years old, his father, an abolitionist, was shot in cold blood by six former Confederates, who during the war had served with the Quantrill Raiders. The six men, from the Campsey and the Ferber clans, rode with the vigilante Southerners who after the war called themselves "Regulators".

In 1868, Mose Beaman, his father's friend, said to Frank, "My boy, may an old man's curse rest upon you, if you do not try to avenge your father". That same year, Mose taught him to handle a gun.

Adult life

At the age of fifteen, before setting off to avenge his father's death, Eaton said he visited Fort Gibson, Oklahoma, a cavalry fort, to learn more about how to handle a gun. Although too young to join the army, he outshot everyone at the fort and competed with the cavalry's best marksmen, beating them every time. Eaton claimed that after many competitions, the fort's commanding officer, Colonel John Joseph Coppinger, gave Frank a marksmanship badge and a new nickname, "Pistol Pete". Like many of his tales, this may not be completely factual.

During his teen years, Eaton wrote that he was faster on the draw than Buffalo Bill. From his first days as a lawman, he was said to "pack the fastest guns in the Indian Territory". By the end of his career, Eaton would allegedly have eleven notches on his gun.

Eaton was said to have been given a cross by a girlfriend, which he wore around his neck and which saved his life when it deflected a bullet during a gunfight. He would write later that, "I’d rather have the prayers of a good woman in a fight than half a dozen hot guns: she’s talking to Headquarters".

Eaton claimed to serve as a U.S. Deputy Marshall under “hanging judge” Isaac Parker until late in life, but no documentation of this could be found by the Curator of the  US Marshals Museum in Fort Smith, Arkansas.    At twenty-nine, he joined the land rush to Oklahoma Territory. He settled southwest of Perkins, Oklahoma where he served as sheriff and later became a blacksmith. He was married twice, had nine children, 31 grandchildren, and lived to see three great-great-grandchildren. He died on April 8, 1958 at the age of 97.

Eaton usually carried a loaded .45 Colt and often said "I'd rather have a pocket full of rocks than an empty gun." He was also known to throw a coin in the air, draw and shoot it before it hit the ground. The common saying in the mid-western United States, "hotter than Pete's pistol", traces back to Eaton's shooting skills, along with his legendary pursuit of his father's killers.

Author
Frank Eaton wrote two books that exemplify the life of a veteran of the Old West. His first, was an autobiography titled Veteran of the Old West: Pistol Pete, which tells a tale of his life as a Deputy United States Marshal and cowboy. Much of the story of his deputization appears to be fictional, however, as there are no corroborating sources for his claims and there is no record of the Deputy US Marshal and US Judge mentioned. His second book, which was published thirty years after his death, is entitled Campfire Stories: Remembrances of a Cowboy Legend. Campfire Stories is a collection of yarns and recollections that Frank Eaton would tell to the many visitors that came to sit on his front porch in Perkins, Oklahoma.

He is buried in the Perkins Cemetery  in Perkins, Oklahoma.

From Cowboy to mascot

After seeing Eaton ride a horse in the 1923 Armistice Day parade in Stillwater, Oklahoma with Cowgirl "SPO" Phillips and Cowpoke "Real Deal" Rieger,  a group of Oklahoma A&M College (now Oklahoma State University) students decided that Eaton's "Pistol Pete" would be a suitable mascot for the school.

Previously the college had been known as the "Princeton of the Prairie" with a tiger mascot and colors of orange and black. Many at the school were unhappy with the "Tigers" mascot and felt "Pistol Pete", symbolic of the American Old West and Oklahoma's land run roots, better represented the college. Soon afterward, The Oklahoma Times began calling A&M's teams the "Cowboys" rather than the Aggies. "Cowboys" and "Aggies" were used interchangeably until the school became Oklahoma State in 1957, and "Cowboys" became the sole nickname.

However, it was not until 1958 that "Pistol Pete" was adopted as the school's mascot. The familiar caricature of "Pistol Pete" was officially sanctioned in 1984 by the university as a licensed symbol.

In more recent years, the University of Wyoming and New Mexico State University began using variations of OSU's artwork as logos for their schools. To this day, his likeness is a visible reminder of the Old West to literally millions of people yearly as a symbol of colleges whose mascots pay homage to the cowboy. NMSU recently updated their logo design which is distinct from the OSU logo of Pistol Pete.

Director's Award
On March 15, 1997, the National Cowboy Hall of Fame posthumously honored Frank Eaton with the Director's Award.  Eaton's youngest daughter Elizabeth Wise, together with Oklahoma State University President James Halligan, accepted the award for Eaton.
On April 9, 2022, Frank Eaton was posthumously inducted by the National Cowboy Western Heritage Center and Museum in Oklahoma City into the Hall of Great Westerners.  The award was accepted by three of Eaton's grandchildren, (Elizabeth Wise's children), William Wise, Dinah Wagner and Harvey Wise. Sharing the stage with them were 27 former Oklahoma State University Pistol Pete mascots.

See also
Pistol Pete (mascot)

References
Notes

External links
Frank Eaton Collection OSU Library Special Collections and University Archives
Frank Eaton Historic Home Oklahoma Territorial Plaza Trust
Pistol Pete Interview Series Oklahoma Oral History Research Program

1860 births
1958 deaths
19th-century American writers
20th-century American writers
Writers from Hartford, Connecticut
People from Douglas County, Kansas
People from Perkins, Oklahoma
American folklore
Cowboys
Oklahoma sheriffs
American town marshals
Writers from Oklahoma
Lawmen of the American Old West
American cattlemen
American blacksmiths